The 1909 Carlisle Indians football team represented the Carlisle Indian Industrial School as an independent during the 1909 college football season. Led by eighth-year head coach Pop Warner, the Indians compiled a record of 10–2–1 and outscored opponents 243 to 94. Warner's team ran the single-wing on offense.

Schedule

See also
 1909 College Football All-America Team

References

Carlisle
Carlisle Indians football seasons
Carlisle Indians football